"Where Do Teenagers Come From?" is a 1980 episode of the American television anthology series ABC Afterschool Special, which aired on March 5, 1980. The live action-animation episode was produced by DePatie-Freleng Enterprises and was a sequel to the 1977 episode My Mom's Having a Baby. The episode was notable for its signature song "Growing Up", written by Doug Goodwin.

Premise
When 12-year-old Kelly begins to experience changes in her body, she, along with Petey and Oscar, once again visit Dr. Lendon Smith, who uses an animated film that explains in detail (via Smith's narraration) of how teenagers, especially young girls, experience adolescence and how her body changes.

Cast
 Shane Sinutko as Petey Evans
 Jarred Johnson as Oskar
 Rachael Longaker as Kelly
 Lendon Smith as himself
 Stephanie Steele as Julie

References

External links
 
 Review from MSN movies

1980 American television episodes
ABC Afterschool Special episodes
Sex education
Works about adolescence